Quảng Đông may refer to several places in Vietnam, including:

 , a rural commune of Thanh Hóa city.
 Quảng Đông, Quảng Bình, a rural commune of Quảng Trạch District.

See also
 Guangdong (Vietnamese: Quảng Đông)